We Don't Even Live Here is the fourth solo studio album by American rapper P.O.S. It was released on Rhymesayers Entertainment on October 23, 2012. It peaked at number 47 on the Billboard 200 chart.

Release
Preorders of the album came complete with materials from anarchist collective Crimethinc.

Critical reception

At Metacritic, which assigns a weighted average score out of 100 to reviews from mainstream critics, the album received an average score of 76, based on 14 reviews, indicating "generally favorable reviews".

Genevieve Koski of The A.V. Club gave the album a grade of A−, writing, "We Don't Even Live Here is extraordinarily accessible and somehow even agreeable in its controlled rage, the soundtrack to an anarchic end-of-the-world party that listeners can only hope they’re outsider enough to attend." David Jeffries of AllMusic gave the album 4 out of 5 stars, describing it as "a literate, sharp blast of revolution with an anarchist slant."

ABC News placed it at number 24 on the "50 Best Albums of 2012" list.

Track listing

Personnel
Credits adapted from liner notes.

 P.O.S – vocals, production (1, 3, 12), photography
 Ben Ivascu – drums (1, 2, 3, 7, 11)
 Lazerbeak – production (2, 5, 6, 7)
 Chris "Sick Boy" Lee – drums (2, 6, 7, 11)
 Andrew Dawson – production (3, 6), recording, mixing
 Justin Vernon – vocals (3)
 Astronautalis – vocals (3, 4), photography
 Justin Pierre – vocals (3, 6)
 Jessy Greene – violin (4)
 Cecil Otter – production (4, 11, 13)
 Sims – vocals (5)
 Patric Russel – production (8)
 Mike Mictlan – vocals (8)
 Ryan Olson – production (9)
 2% Muck – tweak (9)
 Boys Noize – production (10)
 Housemeister – production (10)
 Manchita – vocals (10)
 Isaac Gale – vocals (11)
 Busdriver – vocals (12)
 Max Plisskin – mixing assistance
 Chris Athens – mastering
 Eric Timothy Carlson – artwork, design
 Isaak Gale – photography
 Kelly Loverud – photography
 Weather Grider – photography
 John Grider – photography
 J. Cook – project coordination
 S. Rossi – project coordination
 S. Alexander – executive production
 S. Daley – executive production
 B. Sayers – executive production

Charts

References

External links
 
 We Don't Even Live Here at Rhymesayers Entertainment

2012 albums
P.O.S albums
Rhymesayers Entertainment albums
Albums produced by Lazerbeak